"Małomiasteczkowy" is a Polish-language indie pop single performed by Dawid Podsiadło. The lyrics were written by Dawid Podsiadło, and the music was composed and produced by Bartosz Dziedzic. The song was released as a single on 6 June 2018 by Sony Music Entertainment Poland label company, and later appeared on the Małomiasteczkowy album which was released on 19 October 2018.

The song was highly listed on numerous music charts in Poland, including having first place on AirPlay – Top and AirPlay – Nowości by the Polish Society of the Phonographic Industry. It was awarded the diamond certification by the Polish Society of the Phonographic Industry. In 2019, it was nominated to the Fryderyk award, in the categories of best song, and best music video of the year.

Charts

Certifications

Awards

Notes

References 

Malomiasteczkowy
2018 singles
Polish-language songs
Number-one singles in Poland